Darcham (also Romanized as Dārcham; also known as Qal‘eh-ye Dārcham) is a village in Muzaran Rural District, in the Central District of Malayer County, Hamadan Province, Iran. At the 2006 census, its population was 23, in 7 families.

References 

Populated places in Malayer County